The Roman Catholic Diocese of Kabankalan (Lat: Dioecesis  Cabancalensis) is a diocese of the Catholic Church in central Philippines. The Roman Rite Latin Church diocese is centered in the City of Kabankalan in Negros Occidental province and covers the southern part of the province. The diocese was created in 1987, when the Diocese of Bacolod was split into three dioceses. The other new diocese created is the Diocese of San Carlos, which covers the northeastern part of Negros Island and includes former parishes of the Diocese of Dumaguete in Negros Oriental province. The Diocese of Kabankalan is a suffragan of the Archdiocese of Jaro like the other two dioceses of Negros Occidental.

The titular patron of the diocese is Saint Francis Xavier whose feast is celebrated every December 3. The seat of the bishop is the Saint Francis Xavier Cathedral in Kabankalan. The diocesan cathedral is one of the 12 churches founded by the Order of Augustinian Recollects that are now Catholic cathedrals in the Philippines.

Diocesan Coat of Arms 
The yellow background is the color of the Church and of the Papacy. It was for Our Lord’s Church and for his visible representative on earth that ST. FRANCIS XAVIER, the Patron of the Diocese of Kabankalan, incessantly worked and offered his life as a Jesuit missionary. The cross and the hand holding it belongs to this dauntless Saint, who journeyed throughout Asia and the Pacific to set the torch of Faith, Hope and Charity ablaze in the hearts and in the lives of people he converted to Christianity.

The clear skies, the mountains ranges and the sugarcane depict the typical milieu in the Diocese of Kabankalan. The stalks of sugarcane, which remain the chief produce of Negros Island, depict the aim of the Diocese to be in solidarity with its people.

Jurisdiction
The Diocese of Kabankalan comprises the entire southern portion of Negros Occidental, extending from the town of La Castellana, just below La Carlota City, all the way to Hinoba-an on the southernmost coast. The cities and municipalities under the Diocese of Kabankalan are Kabankalan, Binalbagan, Himamaylan, Isabela, Moises Padilla, La Castellana, Ilog, Candoni, Cauayan, Sipalay, and Hinoba-an except Hinigaran.

Ordinaries

See also
Catholic Church in the Philippines

References

Kabankalan
Kabankalan
Christian organizations established in 1987
Roman Catholic dioceses and prelatures established in the 20th century
Religion in Negros Occidental